Union Township is a township in Doniphan County, Kansas, USA.  As of the 2000 census, its population was 360.

History
Union Township was created in 1878.

Geography
According to the USGS, it contains five cemeteries: Anderson, Denton, Robertson, Saint Marys and Victory.

References

 USGS Geographic Names Information System (GNIS)

External links
 US-Counties.com
 City-Data.com

Townships in Doniphan County, Kansas
Townships in Kansas
1878 establishments in Kansas
Populated places established in 1878